Duminichi is the name of several inhabited localities in Russia.

Urban localities
Duminichi (settlement), Kaluga Oblast, a settlement in Duminichsky District of Kaluga Oblast

Rural localities
Duminichi, Kaliningrad Oblast, a settlement in Zhilinsky Rural Okrug of Nemansky District of Kaliningrad Oblast
Duminichi (railway station), Kaluga Oblast, a railway station in Duminichsky District, Kaluga Oblast
Duminichi (village), Kaluga Oblast, a village in Duminichsky District, Kaluga Oblast